Thyroxine deiodinase may refer to one of two enzymes:
Iodothyronine deiodinase
Thyroxine 5-deiodinase